is a Japanese mixed-media franchise created by Azone International and Acus. It mainly consists of two lines of toy figurines titled Assault Lily and Custom Lily. The series takes a theme of combining "girls" and "weapons" and revolves around teenager girls called "Lily" who have to fight against monsters called "Huge" using their weapon called "Charm". Two novels have been published; the first, titled , was released in June 2015, and the second, titled , was released in July 2017. Three stage plays based on the series have also been performed.

An anime television series adaptation by Shaft, titled , aired from October to December 2020. A spin-off mini anime, titled Assault Lily Fruits, aired from July 2021 to January 2022.

Plot
In a near future, humanity is threatened by the existence of monsters they call . To anticipate this, the whole world unites against Huge and succeeds in developing a decisive weapon called  that brings together the power of science and magic. Since Charm shows high synchronization to teenage girls, these girls are called  and are regarded as heroes. To train them, the Lily training institution called  was established all over the world to counter Huge, and became a "sanctuary" to protect and guide people.

Characters

Yurigaoka Girls Academy

Team Hitotsuyanagi

A normal girl who aimed to become a Lily after Yuyu saved her from a Huge attack two years ago and came to Yurigaoka Academy to find her.

A well respected sophomore at Yurigaoka Academy. She always fights alone. She is greatly affected by the death of her partner Misuzu, who died prior to the events of the anime.

A first year student and a daughter of the chairman of the top Charm manufacturer company Grand Guinol. She is hailed from a mixed Franco-Japanese family.

A brilliant student and an otaku, she is obsessed with anything related to Lily.

A girl who has a very dark past due to being betrayed and abused despite her attempt to demonstrate kindness, and she distrusts many people, including her Lily teammates.

A girl who comes from Vietnam. She dislikes strict training, but has an upbeat personality and doesn't get angry even when she is ridiculed.

A girl who comes from Taipei. She is a kind girl but always stands up for what she believes is right.

A girl of Chinese descent who was born in Iceland, and attended a Swedish middle school before transferring to Yurigaoka. She is a friend of Shenlin Kuo. She is quiet and self-confident, but she isn't great at showing emotion.

A friendly girl who is from Germany. She is seen as cute and genius, but is also a game addict, troublemaker and always curious about something news. She easily gets shunned by serious people.

A mysterious girl discovered by Team Hitotsuyanagi under investigation on the beach. Yuyu and Riri take care of her, but she later dies after fighting a Huge.

Alfheim

An excellent Lily with a cheerful personality and a combat power based on high physical ability. It was Kusumi Egawa who persuaded her to not give up being a Lily after her Legion was disbanded.

A calm, quiet yet excellent and powerful Lily, which earns her a nickname "Child of God". But she loses trust of everyone due to an unknown incident in the past.

Reginleif

A careless and gentle girl but with a strong determination. She is the last surviving member of her clan and loses the feeling of left arm due to past injuries.

Ludwig Private Academy

Odaiba Girls' School

Sagami Girls' High School

Other characters

Production and release
An anime television series adaptation titled Assault Lily Bouquet was announced on October 13, 2019. The series was produced by Shaft, directed by Shouji Saeki, and chief directed by Hajime Ootani, with Mieko Hosoi designing the characters. Akito Matsuda composed the music, and both Saeki and Shaft, under the pseudonym Fuyashi Tō, are credited for series composition, with Saeki himself writing the scripts for all of the episodes. Kazuya Shiotsuki (Shaft), Sayuri Sakimoto, and Kentarou Tokiwa were the chief animation directors; and following episode 8, Akihisa Takano (Shaft) joined as a fourth chief animation director.

Raise A Suilen performed the opening theme "Sacred world". Hitotsuyanagi-tai, a unit consisting of the main characters, performed the first ending theme "Edel Lilie" from Episodes 1–4, 6–7, and 10–12, while Hikaru Akao and Yūko Natsuyoshi performed the second ending theme "Heart + Heart" for Episode 5 as their characters Riri Hitotsuyanagi and Yuyu Shirai, respectively, Hitotsuyanagi-tai performed the third ending theme "GROWING*" for Episode 8, and Miku Itō performed the fourth ending theme  for Episode 9 as her character Yuri Hitotsuyanagi.

The series was originally scheduled for a July 2020 debut, but due to the COVID-19 pandemic, it aired from October 2 to December 25, 2020 on TBS and BS-TBS. Funimation licensed the series and streamed it on its website in North America and the British Isles. On October 29, 2020, Funimation announced that the series would receive an English dub, which premiered the following day.

On January 12, 2021, it was announced that the series would be getting a spin-off mini-anime, titled , which was released from July 20, 2021 to January 4, 2022. Shouji Saeki returned to direct the series with Akito Matsuda's music; Yumi Shimizu designed the series' chibi characters; and Shaft producer Miku Ooshima wrote the screenplay. Hikaru Akao, Yūko Natsuyoshi, Ayaka Fujii, and Kaori Maeda performed the series' theme "Can't Stop Fruity" as their respective characters.

Episode list

Assault Lily Bouquet

Assault Lily Fruits

Other media

Light novels
A light novel adaptation, titled , was published by Micro Magazine under their imprint GC Novels. It written by Kasama Hiroyuki and illustrated by Yaegashi Nan and Mieko Hosoi.

A second light novel, titled , was published by Azone International in July 2017.

Volume list

Assault Lily ~Hitotsuyanagi-tai, Shutsugeki Shimasu!~

Assault Lily Arms

Manga
A manga adaptation by Kousuke Tsukinami, titled , began serialization in Bushiroad's Monthly Bushiroad magazine on July 8, 2020.

A spin-off manga illustrated by Minori Chigusa, titled Assault Lily Last Bullet: Secret Garden Sweet Memoria, began serialization on the Manga Ōkoku website on June 30, 2022.

Stage plays
A stage play, titled Assault Lily: League of Gardens, ran at the Shinjuku Face venue in Tokyo from January 9 to January 15, 2020. A second stage play, titled Assault Lily: The Fateful Gift, ran at the Tokyo Tatemono Brillia Hall from September 3 to September 13, 2020. A third stage play, titled Assault Lily: Lost Memories, ran at the Sunshine Theatre in Tokyo from January 20 to January 30, 2022.

Mobile game
An RPG of the series titled Assault Lily: Last Bullet was released on January 20, 2021 for the Android and iOS platforms.

Reception
In a review on Erica Friedman's Okazu, Kristin called it a trap for yuri, saying she highly doubts "it will be worth it unless you're really into the skin and bouncing boobs of teenage girls." Even so, some called the romance between Kaede and Riri a good sign for those fans tired of having lesbian characters "doomed to the Wasteland of Subtext."

Notes

References

External links
Action figure official website 
Portal website 
Bouquet official website 
Assault Lily: Last Bullet official website 

2015 Japanese novels
2020s Japanese LGBT-related television series
2021 anime ONAs
Action anime and manga
Anime postponed due to the COVID-19 pandemic
Bushiroad
Crunchyroll anime
Japanese LGBT-related animated television series
Magical girl anime and manga
Mass media franchises
Shaft (company)
Shōnen manga
TBS Television (Japan) original programming
Toy figurines